The Communist Party of Bohemia and Moravia (KSČM) held a leadership election in May 2016. Incumbent Vojtěch Filip sought re-election. Other candidates included Josef Skála and Ivan Hrůza. Hrůza suspended his candidature before the voting started and endorsed Skála. Skála was considered the candidate of radical members of KSČM.

Filip won the election and was elected for another four years. Skála's candidature was called a revolution attempt of orthodox communists.

Result

References

Communist Party of Bohemia and Moravia leadership elections
Communist Party of Bohemia and Moravia leadership election
Communist Party of Bohemia and Moravia leadership election
Indirect elections
Communist Party of Bohemia and Moravia leadership election
Communist Party of Bohemia and Moravia leadership election